Zeta toxin may refer to:
Zeta toxin protein domain, a protein domain found in prokaryotes
UDP-N-acetylglucosamine kinase, an enzyme